This is a list of current and former locks and dams of the Upper Mississippi River which ends at the Mississippi River's confluence with the Ohio River at Cairo, Illinois.

Locks and dams

Expansion proposals for upper Mississippi locks
The Army Corps of Engineers has studied the expansion of some locks on the Upper Mississippi. Since at least 1999, the Corps has considered expanding 600 ft locks 20, 21, 22, 24, and 25 to 1,200 ft.

Gallery

See also
 List of crossings of the Upper Mississippi River
 Mississippi Valley Division
List of locks and dams of the Ohio River

References

External links

USACE St. Paul District Locks and Dams
Historic American Engineering Record (HAER) historical overviews:
 (Lock & Dam Nos. 3–10)

HAER documentation of individual locks and dams:

 
Historic American Engineering Record in Iowa
Historic American Engineering Record in Minnesota
Historic American Engineering Record in Missouri
Works Progress Administration
Works Progress Administration in Illinois
Miss
Miss
Mississippi Valley Division